Huckabee or Huckabees can refer to:

 Huckabee, TV political commentary program on Fox News
 Huckabee (surname), English-language surname
 The Huckabee Report, radio show
 I Heart Huckabees, 2004 film